Siah Kamar (also Romanized as Sīāh Kamar and Sīyāh Kamar) is a village in Baladarband Rural District, in the Central District of Kermanshah County, Kermanshah Province, Iran. At the 2006 census, its population was 1,029, in 209 families.

References 

Populated places in Kermanshah County